Stewarton is a hamlet on the junction of the B842 and B843 roads, in Kintyre, Argyll and Bute, Scotland, located around  west of Campbeltown.

Plantation Halt was a nearby station on the Campbeltown and Machrihanish Light Railway that opened in 1906 and closed in 1932.

References 

Hamlets in Argyll and Bute
Villages in Kintyre